Courtney Knight is a Canadian Paralympian athlete competing mainly in category P13 discus throw events.	
	
Knight competed in the 1996 Summer Paralympics in Atlanta, Georgia, United States.  There she won a silver medal in the women's Discus throw - F12 event and finished fourth in the women's Pentathlon - P10-12 event.  She also competed at the 2000 Summer Paralympics in Sydney, Australia.    There she won a silver medal in the women's Pentathlon - P13 event and finished fourth in the women's Discus throw - F13 event.  She also competed at the 2004 Summer Paralympics in Athens, Greece.    There she won a bronze medal in the women's Discus throw - F13 event

External links
 

Paralympic track and field athletes of Canada
Athletes (track and field) at the 1992 Summer Paralympics
Athletes (track and field) at the 1996 Summer Paralympics
Athletes (track and field) at the 2000 Summer Paralympics
Athletes (track and field) at the 2004 Summer Paralympics
Paralympic biathletes of Canada
Biathletes at the 2010 Winter Paralympics
Paralympic cross-country skiers of Canada
Cross-country skiers at the 2010 Winter Paralympics
Paralympic silver medalists for Canada
Paralympic bronze medalists for Canada
Living people
Medalists at the 1996 Summer Paralympics
Medalists at the 2000 Summer Paralympics
Medalists at the 2004 Summer Paralympics
Canadian female biathletes
Canadian female discus throwers
Canadian pentathletes
Year of birth missing (living people)
Paralympic medalists in athletics (track and field)
Visually impaired discus throwers
Paralympic discus throwers